Arianna Perilli (born 1978 in Rimini) is a Sammarinese professional target shooter.

External links
 

Living people
Sammarinese female sport shooters
Trap and double trap shooters
1978 births
Sportspeople from Rimini
Shooters at the 2015 European Games
European Games silver medalists for San Marino
European Games medalists in shooting
Olympic shooters of San Marino
Shooters at the 2016 Summer Olympics